The  Ministry of Finance  is a Cabinet department in the Executive branch of the Republic of Bashkortostan government.  The head of the Ministry is the Minister of Finance, who was Rida Tagirovna Subkhankulova as of 2016.

Notes and references

External links
 Republic of Bashkortostan Ministry of Finance Official Website in Russian

Politics of Bashkortostan
Government ministries of Bashkortostan
Bashkortostan